By Popular Request is the twenty-sixth studio album by British folk rock band Fairport Convention, released in January 2012. It is a compilation of studio re-recordings of previous material.

Overview
The album was released to coincide with the band's 45th anniversary, and consists of thirteen brand new versions of songs from the band's back catalogue, selected by fans through the band's website.

Track listing
 "Walk Awhile" (Richard Thompson, Dave Swarbrick) (Originally from Full House)
 "Crazy Man Michael" (Richard Thompson, Dave Swarbrick) (Originally from Liege and Lief)
 "The Hiring Fair" (Ralph McTell) (Originally from Gladys' Leap)
 "The Hexhamshire Lass" (Traditional; arranged by Fairport Convention) (Originally from Nine)
 "Red and Gold" (Ralph McTell) (Originally from Red & Gold)
 "Sir Patrick Spens" (Traditional; arranged by Fairport Convention) (Originally from Full House)
 "Genesis Hall" (Richard Thompson) (Originally from Unhalfbricking)
 "Farewell Farewell" (Richard Thompson) (Originally from Liege and Lief)
 "Rosie" (Dave Swarbrick) (Originally from Rosie)
 "Matty Groves" (Traditional; arranged by Fairport Convention) (Originally from Liege and Lief)
 "Fotheringay" (Sandy Denny) (Originally from What We Did on Our Holidays)
 "Jewel in the Crown" (Julie Matthews) (Originally from Jewel in the Crown)
 "Meet on the Ledge" (Richard Thompson) (Originally from What We Did on Our Holidays)

Personnel
Fairport Convention
Simon Nicol - vocals, acoustic guitar, electric guitar
Dave Pegg - vocals, bass guitar
Chris Leslie - vocals, mandolin, bouzuki, violin, banjo, whistle
Ric Sanders - violin, keyboards
Gerry Conway - drums, percussion
Guest musician
Edmund Whitcombe - cornet on "Red and Gold" and "Meet on the Ledge"

References

Fairport Convention albums
2012 albums
Albums produced by John Gale